Isosceles are a Scottish indie pop band formed in Glasgow, Scotland. The band is composed of Jack Valentine (Guitar & Vocals), William Aikman (Keyboards & Vocals), Andrew Wilson (Bass) and Bobby Duff (Drums).

Formed in 2006 for a one-off gig, the band began playing gigs around Glasgow and recording songs which would eventually be played by Vic Galloway on Radio One. This exposure resulted in the Leeds-based independent record label Art Goes Pop offering to release "Get Your Hands Off / I Go" in 2007. Alex Kapranos from Franz Ferdinand was at the single launch and asked Isosceles to support them on a tour of the Scottish Highlands including gigs in Inverness, Fort William, Dundee and Portree.

At the start of 2008 they began their first tour of England before releasing their second single "Kitch Bitch" / "Watertight" in April. Further gigs in England were followed by appearances at Glastonbury and T In The Park. In September 2008, the band played at the Venice Biennale of Architecture in Venice. Isosceles continued to play around Glasgow, with the band supporting Correcto, Clinic, The Vaselines and Shonen Knife.

Discography

Singles
"Get Your Hands Off" (2007)
"Kitch Bitch" / "Watertight" (2008)

References

External links
MySpace
YouTube

Musical groups from Glasgow
Scottish indie rock groups